Procecidochares atra is a species of tephritid or fruit flies in the genus Procecidochares of the family Tephritidae.

Its galls are most common on Solidago altissima, S. gigantea, S. rugosa.

Distribution
Canada, United States, Mexico.

References

Tephritinae
Insects described in 1862
Diptera of North America
Procecidochares
Gall-inducing insects